Edward Lionel Pape (17 April 1877 – 21 October 1944) was an English born stage and screen actor. His acting career begun in his native UK with eventual migration to the US. He appeared on the Broadway stage in over 20 productions between 1912 and 1935. The beginning of his screen career goes back to the silent film era. Between the 1930s and early 1940s, he played supporting roles and bit parts in over 50 Hollywood movies. He played in numerous films of directors like John Ford, Ernst Lubitsch and George Cukor. Pape portrayed Katharine Hepburn's butler in The Philadelphia Story (1940) and appeared as the oppressive coal mine owner in How Green Was My Valley (1941).

Partial filmography

The Pursuing Shadow (1915) - Viscount Acheson
Evidence (1915) - Bertie Stavely
Flame of Passion (1915)
The Pearl of the Antilles (1915) - Murray Carson
The Sporting Duchess (1920) - Captain Cyprian Streatfield
The Fatal Hour (1920) - The Duke of Exmoor
The New York Idea (1920) - Sir Wilfrid Darby
 Nobody (1921) - Noron Ailsworth
Two for Tonight (1935) - Lord Ralston (uncredited)
The Man Who Broke the Bank at Monte Carlo (1935) - Third Assistant Director
Sylvia Scarlett (1935) - Sergeant Major (uncredited)
Little Lord Fauntleroy (1936) - Party Guest (uncredited)
The White Angel (1936) - War Minister (uncredited)
Mary of Scotland (1936) - Burghley
White Legion (1936) - Dr. Travis
A Woman Rebels (1936) - William C. White (uncredited)
Camille (1936) - General (uncredited)
Beloved Enemy (1936) - Crump
The Plough and the Stars (1936) - Englishman (uncredited)
The King and the Chorus Girl (1937) - Prof. Kornish
The Prince and the Pauper (1937) - Second Lord
Slave Ship (1937) - Commander (uncredited)
Wee Willie Winkie (1937) - Maj. Allardyce
The Emperor's Candlesticks (1937) - 210£ Bidder (uncredited)
Saratoga (1937) - Horse Owner at Party (uncredited)
Angel (1937) - Lord Davington (uncredited)
Man-Proof (1938) - Man Cracking Nuts (uncredited)
Outside of Paradise (1938) - Mr. Stonewall
The Big Broadcast of 1938 (1938) - Lord Droopy
Bluebeard's Eighth Wife (1938) - Monsieur Potin
Fools for Scandal (1938) - Photographer (uncredited)
The Rage of Paris (1938) - Uncle Josephus (uncredited)
The Young in Heart (1938) - Wombat Customer (uncredited)
Booloo (1938) - 2nd Governor
Midnight (1939) - Edouart (uncredited)
The Hound of the Baskervilles (1939) - Coroner
It Could Happen to You (1939) - Alumni Member (uncredited)
5th Ave Girl (1939) - Mr. Pape - Man in Nightclub (uncredited)
Rio (1939) - Jeweler (uncredited)
Eternally Yours (1939) - Mr. Howard
Drums Along the Mohawk (1939) - General (uncredited)
Rulers of the Sea (1939) - First Secretary (uncredited)
Raffles (1939) - Lord Melrose
Congo Maisie (1940) - British Consul
Zanzibar (1940) - Michael Drayton
Cross-Country Romance (1940) - Miller - Mrs. North's Butler (uncredited)
The Long Voyage Home (1940) - Mr. Clifton (uncredited)
Arise, My Love (1940) - Lord Kettlebrook
A Dispatch from Reuter's (1940) - Stock Exchange Chairman (uncredited)
Tin Pan Alley (1940) - Lord Stanley
The Philadelphia Story (1940) - Edward
Hudson's Bay (1941) - Groom of the Chamber (uncredited)
Scotland Yard (1941) - Hugh Burnside
Charley's Aunt (1941) - Hilary Babberly
Dr. Jekyll and Mr. Hyde (1941) - Mr. Marley (uncredited)
How Green Was My Valley (1941) - Evans
Almost Married (1942) - Mr. Marvin (final film role)

References

External links
 Lionel Pape @ IMDb.com
 

1877 births
1944 deaths
Male actors from Sussex
20th-century English male actors
English male silent film actors
English male stage actors
People from Brighton
English emigrants to the United States